Nadan (English: The actor) is a 2013 Malayalam drama film directed by Kamal and written by S. Suresh Babu. Jayaram and Remya Nambeeshan play the lead roles, while the rest of the cast are former theatre artists that include K. P. A. C. Lalitha, Joy Mathew, P. Balachandran, Hareesh Peradi and Sasi Kalinga. It was produced by Anilkumar Ambalakkara under the banner of Ambalakkara Global Films. Nadan features some famous scenes from the famous Kerala People's Arts Club (K P A C) dramas Ningalenne Communistakki and Mudiyanaya Puthran.

Plot
Nadan is the story of a popular drama troupe owned by Devadas Sargavedi, which was previously possessed by his father and grandfather in the past, and speaks about the problems faced by the owner and his survival. The revival of this mighty art through the sustained effort of the talented theatre artists forms the crux of the narrative.

Cast
 Jayaram as Devadas Sargavedi
 Remya Nambeesan as Jyothi
 Sajitha Madathil as Sudharma
 Joy Mathew as G. Krishnakumar
 K. P. A. C. Lalitha as Radhamani
 P. Balachandran as Vikraman Pilla
 Hareesh Peradi as KPAC Bharathan
 Mukundan as Babykuttan
 Malavika Menon as Priyamvada Devadas
 Chembil Ashokan as Abubacker
 Jayaraj Warrier as Kadavoor Manikandan
 Shankar Ramakrishnan
 Balaji Sarma
 Sudheer Karamana  
 Sasi Kalinga as Malakha Johnson
 Sunil Sukhada as Mapranam Pappachan
 Divya Prabha as Haseena

Soundtrack

The songs of Nadan were composed by Ouseppachan and penned by Prabha Varma and Madhu Vasudevan.

Awards
 Kerala State Film Awards
 Best Lyricist - Prabha Varma (for Ethu Sundara) and Madhu Vasudevan (for Ottaykku Paadunna)
 Best Music Director - Ouseppachan (for Ethu Sundara and Ottaykku Paadunna)
 Best Female Singer - Vaikom Vijayalakshmi (for Ottaykku Paadunna)

Vayalar Film Awards
 Best Film
 Best Actor - Jayaram
 Best Music Director - Ouseppachan
 Best Male Singer - G. Sreeram

References

External links
 

2010s Malayalam-language films
2013 films
Films scored by Ouseppachan
Films shot in Kollam
Films directed by Kamal (director)